Dmitri Zakharovich Protopopov (4 October 1897 – 3 March 1986) was First Secretary of the Communist Party of Tajikistan from April 1938 to August 1946. He was a member of the Communist Party since 1917. He was twice awarded the Order of Lenin. He was an ethnic Russian, born in Kostyonki, Voronezh Oblast, Russian Empire.

References

1897 births
1986 deaths
People from Voronezh Oblast
Russian military personnel of World War I
Old Bolsheviks
Cheka
First Secretaries of the Communist Party of Tajikistan
First convocation members of the Supreme Soviet of the Soviet Union
Second convocation members of the Supreme Soviet of the Soviet Union
Recipients of the Order of Lenin
Recipients of the Order of the Red Banner
Burials at Vagankovo Cemetery